Ladislav Novák (5 December 1931 – 21 March 2011) was a Czech football defender and later a football manager. He played 75 matches for Czechoslovakia, 71 of them as a team captain.

He was a participant in the 1962 FIFA World Cup, where Czechoslovakia won the silver medal.

He was also a participant in the 1954 FIFA World Cup and 1958 FIFA World Cup.

In his country Novák played mainly for Dukla Prague and won 8 championship titles with them.

After end of his playing career he worked as a football manager and coached Dukla Praha and briefly Czechoslovakia national team. He won the championship title with Dukla as a coach in 1982.

Honours
Czech Republic
 FIFA World Cup runner-up: 1962

Individual
 UEFA European Championship Team of the Tournament: 1960

Footnotes

References 
 
 Zemřel fotbalový rytíř, kapitán stříbrných "Chilanů“ Novák at iDNES.cz, 21 March 2011. 

1931 births
2011 deaths
Czech footballers
Czechoslovak footballers
Czechoslovakia international footballers
Association football defenders
1954 FIFA World Cup players
1958 FIFA World Cup players
1960 European Nations' Cup players
1962 FIFA World Cup players
Dukla Prague footballers
FK Jablonec players
Czech football managers
Czechoslovak football managers
Czechoslovakia national football team managers
Royal Antwerp F.C. managers
Dukla Prague managers
K.S.C. Lokeren Oost-Vlaanderen managers
K.S.K. Beveren managers
Beerschot A.C. managers
R.W.D. Molenbeek managers
Czechoslovak expatriate sportspeople in Belgium
Expatriate football managers in Belgium
People from Louny
FK Jablonec managers
Sportspeople from the Ústí nad Labem Region